Giovanni Stefano Maia (1672-1747) was an Italian painter of the late Baroque period, active in Genoa and Naples.

Biography
Born and trained in Genoa, he was forced to flee Genoa after participating in a brawl. He moved to Rome and Naples, where he worked under Francesco Solimena. He returned to his native country only in 1727, but was impoverished for commissions since his skill as a portrait artists was not well known.

References

1672 births
1747 deaths
17th-century Italian painters
Italian male painters
18th-century Italian painters
Painters from Genoa
Italian Baroque painters
18th-century Italian male artists